The Charles A. Halbert Public Library is the main library in Saint Kitts and Nevis. In 1982 a fire destroyed the entire building.

After a number of years in a temporary setting it moved into a new permanent setting in 1997.

See also 
 List of national libraries
 Library fires

References

External links
 National Library of Saint Kitts and Nevis

National libraries
Libraries in Saint Kitts and Nevis
Buildings and structures in Basseterre